The 1993 Special Honours in New Zealand was a Special Honours Lists, dated 6 February 1993 and marking Waitangi Day and the centennial of women's suffrage in New Zealand, in which three women were appointed to the Order of New Zealand.

Order of New Zealand (ONZ)
Ordinary member
 Dame Miriam Patricia Dell  – of Ōtaki.
 Margaret Mahy – of Governors Bay.
 The Honourable Tini Whetu Marama Tirikatene-Sullivan  – Member of Parliament for Southern Maori since 1967.

References

Special honours
Special honours